"Never Be the Same Again" is a 2000 single by Melanie C, featuring Lisa Lopes.

Never Be the Same Again may also refer to:

 "Never Be the Same Again" (Ghostface Killah song), 2001
 "Never Be the Same Again", 2013 song by KT Tunstall as a bonus track on some versions of Invisible Empire // Crescent Moon

See also
 "Never Gonna Be the Same Again", a song by Bob Dylan from the 1985 album Empire Burlesque
 Never Be the Same (disambiguation)
 Never Gonna Be the Same (disambiguation)